Margh-e Gachi (also Romanized as Margh-e Gachī; also known as Margh, Marq, and Morgh) is a village in Keraj Rural District, in the Central District of Isfahan County, Isfahan Province, Iran. At the 2006 census, its population was 692, in 193 families.

References 

Populated places in Isfahan County